Satan Never Sleeps  (also known as The Devil Never Sleeps) is a 1962 American drama romance war film directed by Leo McCarey, his final film, in which he returns to the religious themes of his classics Going My Way (1944) and The Bells of St. Mary's (1945). It also is the final screen appearance of actor Clifton Webb.

Plot
In 1949, Catholic priests O'Banion and Bovard are constantly harassed by the Communist People's Party at their remote mission outpost in China. Adding to Father O'Banion's troubles is the mission's cook Siu Lan, an attractive Chinese girl who makes no secret of her love for him.

Under the leadership of Ho San, the communists wreck the mission dispensary and desecrate the chapel. Ho San straps O'Banion to a chair and rapes Siu Lan. Later, when she gives birth to a son, Ho San displays paternal pride but refuses to stop persecuting the priests.

Only after the villagers revolt and his superiors order the killing of all Christians, including his parents, does Ho San become convinced that communism will never solve China's problems. He tries to smuggle Siu Lan, his son and the two priests out of the compound, but their journey is halted within a few miles of freedom by a helicopter sent to prevent Ho San's defection. Before he can be restrained, the Father Bovard dons Ho San's military cap and coat and drives away in the colonel's car. He dies in a spray of bullets from the helicopter, but his sacrifice enables the others to escape. Later, at mission headquarters in Hong Kong, O'Banion officiates at the wedding of Siu Lan and Ho San and baptizes their child.

Cast
 William Holden as Father O'Banion 
 Clifton Webb as Father Bovard 
 France Nuyen as Siu Lan 
 Athene Seyler as Sister Agnes
 Martin Benson as Kuznietsky 
 Edith Sharpe as Sister Theresa 
 Robert Lee as Chung Ren 
 Marie Yang as Ho San's mother 
 Andy Ho as Ho San's father 
 Burt Kwouk as Ah Wang 
Weaver Levy as Ho San
 Noel Hood as Sister Justine

Production
The film was based on an original screenplay by Pearl S. Buck called China Story that had been sold to 20th Century Fox. In 1950, Hal B. Wallis acquired it and in 1960, it came to Leo McCarey.

Father O'Banion was meant to die at the end, but William Holden refused, so the ending was changed.

The film was shot in England and Wales.

Reception
In a contemporary review for The New York Times, critic A. H. Weiler called Satan Never Sleeps "a lackluster imitation" of Leo McCarey's Going My Way and wrote: "There is no doubt that the hearts of Mr. McCarey and company are in the right places but Satan Never Sleeps has little heart in it. This Satan is a direct descendant of Madama Butterfly and soap opera."

In a current-day review, Time Out described Satan Never Sleeps as a "dreadful, trashy yarn" and "propaganda designed to equate Communism with Satan." The review concluded: "Satan may not sleep, but you will."

References

External links

 
 
 
 

1962 films
1962 drama films
1960s English-language films
Films about Catholicism
Films directed by Leo McCarey
Films scored by Richard Rodney Bennett
Films set in the 1940s
History of China on film
Cold War films
20th Century Fox films
American black-and-white films
CinemaScope films
Films shot at MGM-British Studios
Films about Catholic priests